Boutilier is a surname. Notable people with the surname include:

 Alicia Boutilier (born 1968), Canadian art curator
 Ava Boutilier (born 1999), Canadian ice hockey goaltender
 Goldie Boutilier (born 1985), Canadian singer and songwriter
 Guy Boutilier (born 1958–59), Canadian politician
 Kate Boutilier (born 1966), American screenwriter
 Paul Boutilier (born 1963), Canadian ice hockey defenceman
 Robert Boutilier (1953–2003), Canadian biologist
 Rob Boutilier (born 1971), Canadian animator, director, writer, and storyboard artist

See also
 Boutiliers Point, Nova Scotia, rural community in Halifax
 Boutilier v. Immigration and Naturalization Service, lawsuit
 Boutillier, surname
 Le Boutillier, surname